A paintball marker, also known as a paintball gun, paint gun, or simply marker, is an air gun used in the  shooting sport of paintball, and the main piece of paintball equipment. Paintball markers use compressed gas, such as carbon dioxide (CO2) or compressed air (HPA), to propel dye-filled gel capsules called paintballs through the barrel and quickly strike a target. The term "marker" is derived from its original use as a tool for forestry personnel to mark trees and ranchers to mark wandering cattle.

While greater muzzle velocity is possible, it has been ruled unsafe for use on most commercial paintball fields.

Marker types
Paintball markers fall into two main categories in terms of mechanism – mechanical and solenoid driven electropneumatic.

Mechanically operated

Mechanically operated paintball markers operate using solely mechanical means, and as such do not use electro-pneumatic solenoids controlled by an electronic board to fire.

There five main methods of mechanical operation:

Pump or Bolt Action: the mechanism of the marker must be manually reset in between each shot, similar to pump-action shotguns and bolt-action rifles. Markers of this type are the oldest used in the sport as the first ever game of paintball was played using the bolt-action Nelspot pistol. There are two main patterns of internals upon which most pump- and bolt-action markers operate:
 Sheridan Valve: Named after the Sheridan series of markers which first employed this design, markers which employ this mechanism have the bolt which loads the paintball is located in a separate tube from the hammer and valve. To cock the mechanism, the bolt is pulled backwards thus opening the breech and loading a paintball. Doing so also pulls the hammer backwards against the main spring, which is then held back by a sear connected to the trigger. The bolt is then pushed forward, which loads the paintball into the barrel and the marker is ready to fire. Pulling the trigger releases the hammer which is propelled forward by the main spring, hitting the valve pin and opening the valve which allows compressed gas to flow from the valve chamber into the barrel chamber thus propelling the loaded paintball forward and out of the barrel. The valve spring  then closes the valve with the hammer still resting on the valve pin, after which this cycle must be repeated in order to fire another paintball. Notable examples of markers which operate in this way include the Sheridan K2, the Worr Games Products Sniper and the Chipley Custom Machine S6.
 Nelson Valve: Named after the Nelson Paint Company whose marker, the Nelspot 007, first employed this mechanism. In such markers the bolt, hammer and valve are all located in the same tube. To cock the mechanism, the bolt is pulled back against the main spring to allow a paintball to fall into the breach, at which point the sear latches the hammer to the bolt with the compressed main spring in between them. The bolt and attached hammer are then pushed forward to close the breach and load the paintball into the barrel, at which point the sear can be engaged by the trigger and the marker is ready to fire. Pulling the trigger disengages the sear from the bolt, allowing the main spring to propel the hammer rearwards onto the powertube, thus opening the valve and allowing compressed gases to flow from the valve chamber to the barrel through the powertube and bolt which propel the loaded paintball forward. The valve is then closed by the valve spring and the marker is ready to be re-cocked for the next shot. Notable examples of markers which employ this mechanism are the Nelson Nelspot 007, the CCI Phantom and the Redux.
 Sterling "Hybrid" Valve: A variation or hybrid of these two methods of operation has been employed in the design of the Arrow Precision Sterling, wherein the bolt is located in a separate tube, as in a Sheridan valved marker, the hammer latches to a carrier similar to how it would to the bolt in a Nelson valve design, and when release it hits a Sheridan styled pin valve. There is significant debate as to what type of operations the Sterling employs, as some consider it to be a hybrid between the two main designs, and others simply consider it to be a stacked-tube Nelson.

Double Action: the trigger mechanism of the marker both fires and resets the firing mechanism, similar to the way a double-action revolver operates. Examples include the Line SI Advantage, the NSG Splatmaster Rapide and the Brass Eagle Barracuda.

Throwback Semi-Auto: The mechanism of the marker is cycled using gasses released by the valve which reset the firing mechanism between each shot, similar to the way some semi-automatic rifles such as the AK-47 operates. The internals of blow-back operated markers can be either inline, with the bolt, valve and hammer all aligned along the same axis such as the Tippman 98, or stacked tube with the bolt in a separate tube from the hammer and valve such as the King-man Spider.

Blow Forward Semi-Auto: The firing mechanism of the marker operates using the gases stored in the valve to cycle the bolt and fire the paintball, after which a spring resets the mechanism for the next shot. Notables examples include the Air-gun Designs Auto-mag, Tippmann X-7 Phenom and the Tiberius Arms T8.

Pneumatically Operated Semi-Auto: a low pressure pneumatic piston controlled by a four-way valve connected to the trigger resets the firing mechanism in between shots, and can be thought of as semi-auto conversions of markers which would otherwise be pump or bolt action. Notable examples include the WGP Autococker, the Palmer's Pursuit Shop Blazer and Typhoon.

Electropneumatically operated

In electromagnetic designs, the trigger, instead of being mechanically linked to the action of the marker, simply activates an electronic micro-switch (or more recently, a magnetic or optical sensor). That information is passed through control circuitry to a computer-controlled solenoid valve which can open and close very quickly and precisely, allowing gas to move into or out of various pressure chambers in the marker to move the bolt and fire the paintball. This disconnect of the trigger from the action allows electronic trigger pulls to be very short in length and very lightweight (similar to a mouse click; the mechanisms are virtually identical), which dramatically increases rate-of-fire over a fully mechanical design. Solenoid-controlled gas valve designs also allow for reduced weight of internal parts, which both lightens overall weight and reduces the time it takes for the marker to cycle through firing a single paintball.

Each branch favors a different aesthetic and values different aspects of marker design.

Marker body

Most of the marker's functions and aesthetic features are contained in its body, which contains the main components of the firing mechanism: the trigger frame, bolt and valve. Most paintball marker bodies are constructed from aluminium to reduce the marker's weight, and feature custom milling and color anodizing.

External design
The largest external and ergonomic difference in marker bodies is in the trigger and barrel position. Designers of expensive models attempt to position the trigger frame forward towards the center, or slightly forward of center of the body on speed-ball-oriented markers. This allows the HPA tank to be mounted in a position allowing compactness and balance without requiring any additional modifications that allow the tank to fall down and forwards. Such aftermarket "drop forwards", may create a larger gun profile, which can result in eliminations due to hopper hits. Users often modify less expensive markers to allow a similar mode of operation, albeit by sacrificing a low profile. Although this is not important in games where equipment hits are not counted, in most games, including woodsball games, hopper hits are counted as an elimination. Some markers mount the barrel farther back in the gun body to preserve a compact design, sacrificing the positioning of the trigger forward on the marker body whole paintball gun body should have to clean properly for its better response

Paintball markers are also categorized to a lesser extent by which play style of paintball in which they are intended for use – sporting paintball such as Speedball and Stock Class Paintball, or military simulation style games such as Woodsball.

Trigger frame
Triggers are the player's primary means of interacting with the marker. The amount of force required to fire the marker, as well as the distance the trigger travels before actuating, called the throw, has a marked effect upon the player's ability to achieve high rates of fire. Many markers, especially higher priced markers, use electronic trigger frames with a variety of sensing methods, including micro-switches, hall effect sensors or break-beam infra-red switches. These triggers have short throws, allowing a high rate of fire. Non-electronic markers sometimes use carefully set pneumatic to achieve a light and short trigger pull.

The trigger frame on non-electronic mechanical markers simply use a series of springs and levers to drop a sear, which propels the hammer in the body forward. On electronic markers, the trigger frame houses the electronics that control the solenoid, as well as features such as ball detection systems. Upgraded circuit boards that add improved features are available.

Bolt and valve assembly
The bolt and valve assembly is the mechanism which fires the marker. The valve is a mechanical switch that controls whether or not the marker is firing. The bolt directs the flow of air and controls the entry of paintballs into the chamber. The bolt and valve may be separate components, as in many blowback and poppet-based electromagnetic markers. Alternatively, the valve may be built into the bolt, as in spool-valve electromagnetic markers.

Most modern markers have an open bolt design. When the marker is at rest, the bolt is in the "back" position, and the firing chamber is exposed to the stack of paintballs being fed by the loader. Some markers have closed bolt designs; in the rest position, the bolt, and paintball to be fired, are forward and the feed stack is closed off from the chamber. Closed bolt markers were thought to be more accurate because there is no reciprocating mass when the marker is fired. However, tests have shown that the position of the bolt has little effect on a marker's accuracy.

Bolt and valve in mechanical markers
The majority of mechanical markers employ a simple blowback design utilizing a poppet valve (also known as a "pin valve"), which is opened when struck by a compression force, provided in the form of a hammer propelled by a spring. This type of marker generally uses a "stacked tube" design, in which the valve and hammer is contained in the lower tube, while the bolt, which is connected to the hammer, is in the upper tube.

When the hammer is pulled backwards the internal spring compresses, exerting exponential pressure against the hammer's continued backwards motion. As the hammer and spring mechanism reaches the far end of its backwards range of travel, it is caught and locked in place by a metal catching device known as the sear. The sear holds the hammer in place, allowing the kinetic energy of the bolt's forward motion to be released whenever the sear is depressed. As the trigger is pulled, the sear becomes depressed and allows the hammer to be propelled forward by the spring. The hammer collides with the valve releasing gas from the external pressurized tank into the internal bolt chamber. The ensuing burst of gas channels out the front end of the bolt, propelling the paintball down the barrel. The rest of the gas pushes backwards on the hammer, pushing both it and the bolt backwards until the mechanism is once again caught on the sear. Once caught, the hammer is ready to repeat the blowback process. In cases where the pressure from the storage vessel drops under the minimum required to complete the action's cycle, the marker may "runaway" firing rapidly without additional trigger pulls required.

Poppet valves are easy to replace and require little maintenance. The downside to this design, however, is its high operating pressure, which leads to a larger recoil and less accuracy. Some markers have a separate firing and recocking sequence, which decreases the recoil caused by the cycling of the hammer. Markers with a hammer have a firing delay when compared to a full electropneumatic.

Some markers are a hybrid of mechanical and electronic features. In these markers, the hammer and spring continues to activate the valve, but the hammer is released by a solenoid in an electronic trigger frame.

Bolt and valve in electropneumatic markers
Instead of the spring and hammer used to actuate the valve and cycle the bolt assembly in mechanical markers, electropneumatic markers use the rerouting of air to different locations in the marker. This rerouting is controlled by a solenoid that is activated by the trigger. The two types of bolt and valve mechanisms in electropneumatic markers are the poppet-valve and spool-valve.

Poppet-valve-based electropneumatic markers are very similar to mechanical blowback markers. These have a stacked-tube construction, built around a poppet valve, that is opened when struck by a force. Whereas mechanical markers provide that force with a hammer propelled by a spring, the valve in poppet-valve markers are activated by a pneumatic ram. The bolt is connected to the ram. Poppet-valve markers have several disadvantages when compared to spool valves: external moving parts, higher pressure required for poppet to seal, a reciprocating mass and a louder firing signature. However, they are also generally more gas efficient than spool-valve models because the poppet valve opens rapidly and dumps air into the firing chamber faster. Examples of markers that utilize this mechanism are the WDP Angel, Planet Eclipse Ego, Bob Long Intimidator, and Bushmaster.

In Spool-valve-based electropneumatic markers, the bolt also acts as the valve. This eliminates the need for a stacked tube construction; spool valve markers have a more compact profile. Instead of a cycling hammer or ram that strikes a pin valve, the movement of the bolt is controlled by the routing of air into small chambers in front of or behind the bolt. An air reservoir behind the bolt contains the air that is to fire the paintball. When the marker is at rest, air is routed to the front of the bolt to prevent the air in the reservoir from escaping. In an "unbalanced spool valve" design, when the trigger is pulled, that air is exhausted from the marker, allowing the air in the reservoir to push the bolt forwards. In a "balanced spool valve" design, the air in the reservoir cannot force the bolt open; instead, the air from the front of the bolt is rerouted to a small chamber behind the bolt, separate from the reservoir, which then pushes the bolt forward. In either case, the movement of the bolt forward exposes pathways in the bolt or the marker that allow the air in the reservoir behind the bolt to surge forward and fire the paintball. Afterwards, airflow to the front of the bolt is restored, pushing the bolt back into its resting position.

A typical spool valve has at least one O-ring that undergoes a shear and compression duty cycle for every shot, leading to faster wear and less reliability. Additionally, smaller valve openings and longer opening times makes them less gas efficient than their poppet-valve counterparts. Since spool-valve markers have reduced reciprocating mass, and can be operated at lower pressures, they have less recoil and a reduced sound signature. Examples of markers that utilize this mechanism are the Dye Matrix, Smart Parts Shocker, Smart Parts Ion, and the MacDev Clone.

Tuning the bolt and valve system
In mechanical and poppet-based electropneumatic markers, the valve is usually designed to accommodate a specific operating pressure. Low pressure valves provide quieter operation and increased gas efficiency when tuned properly. However, excessively low pressure can decrease gas efficiency as dramatically as excessively high pressure.

Additionally, the valve must be set to release enough air to fire the paintball. If the valve is not tuned properly, insufficient air to fire the paintball may reach the bolt. This phenomenon, known as "shoot-down", causes fired paintballs to gradually lose range, and can also occur at high rates of fire. Some markers have integral or external chambers, called low-pressure chambers, which hold a large volume of gas behind the valve to prevent shoot-down.

Tuning can also prevent air blowing up the feed tube upon firing, which disrupts the feeding of paintballs into the marker.

Loaders
Loaders, commonly known as hoppers, hold paintballs for the marker to fire. The main types are gravity feed, agitating and force-feed. Stick feeds are also used to hold paintballs, although they are not considered to be "hoppers".

While agitating and force-feed hoppers facilitate a higher rate of fire, they are subject to battery failure, as well as degradation if they come into contact with moisture. Such hoppers which are not fitted with photoreceptors are prone to problems with ball breaks. When a paintball leaks paint into the hopper from a break in the hopper, the gelatin shells of the paintballs can deteriorate, causing them to stick together as well as jam in the barrel.

Stick feed
Stick feeds are mainly used on pump and stock-class markers. They consist of simple tubes that hold between ten and twenty paintballs. Stick feeds are usually parallel to the barrel; player must tip the marker to load the next paintball. Some stick feeds are vertical, or at an incline to facilitate gravity feeding, though this contravenes accepted stock-class guidelines.

Gravity feed
Gravity feed is the simplest and cheapest form of hopper available. Gravity feed hoppers consist of a large container and a feed tube molded into the bottom. Paintballs roll down the sloped sides, through the tube and into the marker. These hoppers have a maximum rate of 11.6 balls per second. Gravity feed hoppers are very cheap, since they are made of only a shell and a lid, but can become jammed easily as paintballs accumulate above the tube. Rocking the marker (and hopper) occasionally can  prevent the paintballs from jamming in the hopper.

This problem is exacerbated when using a fully electronic marker. Most mechanical markers use a blowback system for recocking, or other methods where a large reciprocating mass is involved. This will shake the balls in the hopper slightly, facilitating gravity feed. A marker with both electronically controlled recocking and firing may exhibit no shake whatsoever while operating. Because of this, small packs in the hopper are not broken up and feeding problems result.

There are also loaders that resemble military sights that mimic an ACOG or a Red Dot sight, with 20 paintballs capacity at 10 balls per second. Used normally in milsim events or low capacity (lowcap) events (for e.g.: each player can use a maximum of 50 paintballs).

Agitating
Agitating hoppers use a propeller, spinning inside the container, to agitate the paintballs. This prevents them from jamming at the feed neck, allowing them to feed more rapidly than gravity feeds.  Older tournament-level hoppers are of the agitating type, since the higher rate of fire requires a reliable hopper.

There are two types of agitating hoppers: those with sensors – called "eyes" – and those without. The eyes consist of a LED (light emitting diode) and a photodetector, typically a phototransistor or photodiode, inside the neck or tube of the hopper, to detect the presence of a ball. In a hopper, the eyes detect when a ball is absent, causing it to turn. Agitating hoppers without eyes will quickly deplete batteries and may bend or dent paintballs, causing a short, less air efficient, skew shot. Agitating hoppers with eyes will only spin in the absence of a ball, preventing damage and prolonging battery life.

A third type of agitating hopper, the Cyclone Feed System manufactured by Tippmann, re-routes gas to agitate the feeding mechanism. It does not need batteries to operate.

Force-feed
Force-feed hoppers use an impeller to capture paintballs and force them into the marker. The impeller is either spring-loaded or powered by a belt system, allowing it to maintain constant pressure on the stack of paintballs in the feed tube. This allows force-feed hoppers to feed paintballs at a rate exceeding 50 balls per second, since the mechanism does not rely on gravity. Force-feed hoppers are the dominant type used in tournaments, being the only type of loader capable of maintaining the high rate of fire of electropneumatic markers.

Some markers use force-fed loaders shaped as firearms magazines. These are preferred when a low profile is required, as in woodsball sniper positions. Even more unusual are fully contained magazines, incorporating both a source of propellant gas and force-fed paintballs.

The newest type of force feed hoppers communicate wirelessly with the marker's electronics using radio frequency. This allows the hopper to begin feeding paintballs before the pneumatic system of the marker has begun cycling the next shot. This system almost totally eliminates mis-feeds and can increase the speed of the loader and the battery life because the loader is only in operation when the marker is preparing to fire.

Propellant system

The tank holds compressed gas, which is used to propel the paintballs through the marker barrel. The tank is usually filled with carbon dioxide or compressed air. High Pressure Air (HPA) is also known as "nitrogen", as air is 78% nitrogen, or because these systems can be filled with industrial nitrogen. Due to the instabilities of carbon dioxide, HPA tanks are required for consistent velocity.  Other propulsion methods include the combustion of small quantities of propane or electromechanically operated spring-plunger combinations similar to that used in an airsoft gun.

Carbon dioxide
Carbon dioxide (CO2) is a propellant used in paintball, especially in inexpensive markers. It is usually available in a 12 gram powerlet, mainly used in stock paintball and in paintball pistols, or a tank.

The CO2 liquid must vaporize into a gas before it can be used. This causes problems such as inconsistent velocity. Cold weather can cause problems with this system, reducing the vapour pressure and increasing the chance for liquefied gas to be drawn into the marker. The low-temperature liquid can damage the internal mechanisms. Anti-siphon tanks have a tube inside the cylinder, which is bent to prevent liquid carbon dioxide from being drawn into the gun.

On the other hand, a number of paintguns were designed with specific valves to operate on liquid CO2, including some early Tippmann models and the Mega-Z from Montneel – thus solving the problem caused by phase changes. Siphon equipped CO2 tanks are easily identified by the clunking sound their weight makes when the tank is tipped.

After many years of use, Carbon dioxide has almost been universally replaced with High Pressure Air systems (see below)

High-pressure air
High-pressure air, compressed air or nitrogen, is stored in the tank at a very high pressure, typically . The advantage of using regulated HPA over carbon dioxide (CO2) is pressure consistency and temperature stability where CO2 reacts to temperature changes causing inaccuracy and freezing during heavy use.

HPA tanks are more expensive because they must accommodate very high pressures. They are manufactured as steel, aluminium or wrapped carbon fiber tanks, the latter being the most expensive and most lightweight. Most players with electronic markers use HPA because if CO2 is used, the marker's electronic Solenoid valve can be damaged if liquid CO2 enters it.

Users are warned not put any type of lubricant in the 'fill nipple' port of a HPA tank, as petroleum may burn when subjected to highly compressed air, causing an explosion, like in a diesel engine.

Propane
A far less common propellant is propane, featured only in the Tippmann C3. Rather than simply releasing gas as in high-pressure air and CO2 markers, the propane is ignited in a combustion chamber, increasing pressure and opening a valve that lets the expanding gas propel the paintball. There are a number of advantages, mainly shots per tank, ranging from 30,000 to 50,000 shots (depending on the size of the tank) as opposed to the typical 1000 to 2000 shots that are standard with High Pressure Air or CO2 tanks. Another advantage includes availability, as propane is readily available in many stores, whereas CO2 and High Pressure Air are most commonly filled from compressors or pre-filled tanks, which are less common.

However, propane produces heat, which (when firing for an extended period at high rates of fire) can cause burns if improperly handled. It can also be a fire hazard: the Tippmann C3 releases small amounts of flames from the vents in the combustion chamber and out of the barrel when firing. If a marker develops a leak from improper maintenance, it could cause a fire.

Gas regulation
Marker systems have a variety of regulator configurations, ranging from completely unregulated to high-end systems using four regulators, some with multiple stages.

The regulator system affects both the accuracy and the firing velocity. Carbon dioxide regulators must also prevent liquid gas from entering the marker and expanding, causing a dangerous surge in velocity. Regulators used with carbon dioxide often sacrifice throughput and accuracy to ensure the marker operates safely. HPA-only regulators tend to have an extremely high throughput and are designed to ensure uniform pressure between shots to ensure marker accuracy at high rates of fire.

Tournament markers usually are equipped with two regulators, and another on the tank, each with a specific function. A second regulator is used to further reduce this pressure to near the firing pressure. This reduction allows for greater consistency. The air is then supplied to a regulator on the marker body, where the final output pressure is selected. After the firing pressure is decided, tournament-oriented markers use another regulator to supply gas to a separate pneumatic system, to power any other functions, such as bolt movement. This is an extremely low volume, extremely low pressure regulator, usually under .

Barrels
The marker's barrel directs the paintball and controls the release of the gas pocket behind it. Several different bore sizes are made, to fit different sizes of paintball, and there are many lengths and styles. Most modern paintball markers have barrels that screw into the front receiver. Older types slide the barrel on and screw it in place. Barrel threading must be matched to that of the marker. Common threads are: Angel, Autococker, Impulse/Ion, Shocker, Spyder, A-5, and 98 Custom.

Barrels are manufactured in three basic configurations: one piece, two piece and three piece. A barrel with interchangeable bores, with either two or three piece, is called a barrel system, rather than a two-piece or three-piece barrel. This prevents confusion, as many two-piece barrel systems do not use an interchangeable bore system.

One piece barrels are machined from a single piece of material, usually aluminium, but stainless steel has historically been popular. Paintballs can range from .50 to .695 caliber, and barrels are made to match these diameters. Some one piece barrels have a stepped bore that increases from their rated bore size to around .70 caliber after . One-piece barrels are generally less expensive to produce and therefore to purchase, but if a different bore size is desired (for a closer fit to the size of a given brand or batch of paintballs) an entirely new barrel is required. The use of a single material for the entire barrel means that disadvantages of certain materials, such as durability (aluminum) or weight (stainless steel), cannot be mitigated.

Two piece barrels consist of a front and back. The back attaches to the marker and is machined with a specified bore between .682 and .695 caliber. The front makes up the rest of the length and contains the porting. Fronts usually have a larger bore than the back. The design of a two-piece barrel allows for the use of more than one back with a front, to change the effective bore size of the barrel without changing the entire barrel. It also allows for the back to be made of a different material, or be a different color, than the front, allowing aesthetic and performance customizations.

Three-piece barrels have a single back.  A series of inserts, or sleeves, with differing bores are inserted into the back. The front is attached to keep the sleeve in place. Sleeves are generally offered in either aluminium or stainless steel. Aluminium sleeves are light but can be dented or scratched easily; stainless steel versions are more resilient but carry a weight penalty. The user needs only one set of sleeves and a back for each marker. Front sections, which adjust the length of the barrel, can be interchanged. This type offers the widest selection of barrel diameters, usually .680, .681, .682, .683, and up to .696 caliber.

Length
Longer barrels are usually quieter than shorter barrels, allowing excess gas to escape slowly. Many players favor longer barrels as they permit them to push aside the large inflatable bunkers commonly used in paintball tournaments while still staying behind cover.

Most barrels are ported or vented, which means that holes are drilled into the front of the barrel allowing the propellant to dissipate slowly, making the marker quieter. Porting in the first  of the barrel length decreases a marker's gas efficiency. For example, if a  barrel has large porting that starts  past the threads, the ball must travel the other  largely on its own momentum, losing speed (due to friction) rather than gaining more speed from continued air pressure. Compensating for that requires a larger burst of gas, decreasing efficiency.  Porting too early can also dramatically increase noise, as the gas is still under a significant amount of pressure.

Bore
The bore is the interior diameter of the barrel. The bore must properly match the type of paint being fired, the most critical aspect of a barrel. A mismatched selection will result in velocity variations, which causes difficulty in maintaining a close match to field velocity limits and in extreme cases it can affect accuracy. Two and three-piece barrels let the barrel bore be matched to the paint diameter without needing new barrels. Correct matching is especially important in closed-bolt markers that lack ball detents because the ball will roll down, and potentially out of, the barrel. This results in either a dry fire in the event that the ball fell out of the barrel, or a lower velocity shot.

It has been proven that matching bore to paintball size is less efficient. Underboring (barrel is bored smaller than paint diameter) results in good shot consistency and efficiency. Overboring (barrel is bored bigger than paint diameter) results in good shot consistency but worse efficiency. Paint to barrel matching results in no increase in shot consistency or efficiency.

Firing and trigger modes
Since the advent of semi-automatic markers in the early 1990s, both insurance and competitive rules have specified that markers must be semi-automatic only; only one paintball may be fired per trigger pull. While this was a perfectly clear definition when markers were all based on mechanical and pneumatic designs, the introduction of electronically controlled markers in the late 1990s meant that technology had allowed for easy circumvention of this rule. Electronic markers are often controlled by a programmable microcontroller, on which any software might be installed. For example, software may allow the marker to fire more than once per trigger pull, called shot ramping.

Velocity ramping is an electronic firing mode where a consistent, fully automatic firing rate will be triggered as long as the player maintains a low rate of trigger pulls per second.

Pump action
Pump action markers must be manually re-cocked after every shot, much like a pump action shotgun.

Some pump action paintball markers such as the Sterling and many Nelson-based markers like the PMI Tracer and CCI Phantom offer slam-fire action, also known as an auto-trigger, which occurs when the trigger is squeezed and the marker fires with every ensuing recocking of the marker via the pump.

Semi-automatic 
A paintball marker that reloads itself with the next load from the magazine after one shot is called semi-automatic. Semi-automatic markers use a variety of designs to automatically cycle a bolt and load a new paintball into the chamber with each trigger pull. This frees the player from manually pumping the marker, allowing him or her to increase the rate-of-fire. Semi-automatic markers may have a mechanical trigger or an electronic trigger frames. An electronic trigger frame typically has a lighter trigger pull and less space between the trigger and the pressure point, allowing the player to shoot at higher rates of fire. Such frames are commonly available as upgrades to fully mechanical markers, or are integrated into the design of electropneumatic markers.

With the popularity of electronic trigger frames allowing players with such frames to achieve very high rates of fire, tournament leagues began placing limits on the maximum rate of fire of electronic markers used in their events. Manufacturers also often place their own limit on the maximum rate of fire the marker will support, to ensure reliable cycling. Such limits are called caps; tournament caps generally range from 12 to 15 balls per second, while mechanical caps vary according to the design of the marker and the firmware used. If such a cap is enforced, the marker will prevent a ball being fired less than a certain time after the last one, the time delay resulting in the desired maximum rate of fire. A trigger pull occurring before this time has elapsed will be "queued", and the marker will fire again after the delay, but most markers will limit the number of shots that can be "queued" to avoid the marker firing a number of shots after the trigger was last pulled, a so-called "runaway marker".

Fully automatic 
Fully automatic markers fire continually when the trigger is pressed. The Tippmann SMG 60 was the first fully automatic paintball marker. Most electropneumatic paintball guns feature this mode. The fully automatic mode can be added to any electropneumatic marker by installing a customized logic board, or buying a completely new electronic trigger frame.

Similarly, markers can be equipped with burst modes. Ranging from between three and nine shot bursts, these modes allow the player to take accurate shots with a quick pull of the trigger, using more than one ball to increase their chances of hitting the target. In burst mode, the rate of fire can equal that of the fully automatic mode, which is useful in close range situations.

Ramping
Ramping is a feature in some electronic markers that automatically changes the mode of fire from semi-automatic to fully automatic under certain conditions; normally upon a certain number of rapid shots being fired or a minimum rate of fire achieved and sustained. Ramping can be difficult to detect because ramping modes may be inconsistently used. Ramping modes can further be hidden in the software, ensuring that a marker will fire in a legal, semi-auto mode when being tested, but an illegal ramping mode may be engaged by the player under certain conditions.

Some leagues allow a specific ramping mode to prevent problems with enforcement, and to provide a more level playing field with regard to technical skill and marker quality (and price). The rule specifies a minimum time between shots resulting in a maximum rate of fire, and that a certain number of semi-automatic shots must be fired before ramping may engage. With players consistently using a standard ramping mode, players using a different mode are more easily detected.

The rate of fire is enforced by a "PACT" timer, a standard firearms timing device that measures the time between shots. The following are common league-specific ramping modes, preset in the marker's firmware:

PSP Ramping – Ramping begins after 3 shots; the player must maintain at least one pull per second to achieve/maintain ramping. The marker may then fire up to (and no more than) three balls per trigger pull in a "burst" fashion. Rate of fire cannot exceed 12.5 balls per second (as of 2011), even if the player pulls the trigger 5 times per second or faster.
NXL Ramping – Ramping begins after three shots; the player needs only to hold down the trigger to maintain fully automatic fire. Rate of fire cannot exceed 15 balls per second. Firing must cease immediately upon the trigger being released.
Millennium Ramping – Ramping begins after six trigger pulls at a minimum rate of 7.5 pulls per second; the player must maintain 7.5 trigger pulls per second to maintain ramping. Rate of fire cannot exceed 10.5 balls per second. When the player ceases to pull the trigger during ramping, no more than one extra ball may be fired after the last pull.

Safety 
When paintballs hit an object at high speed they have the potential to cause damage; a paintball colliding with human skin, even protected by cloth, may cause bruising or further tissue damage. However, the damage depends on the paintball's velocity, distance, its impact angle, whether it breaks, and which part of the body it hits. Because of the potential for serious soft tissue damage, paintball players must wear a quality paintball mask to protect their eyes, mouth, and ears when barrel blocking devices are not preventing paintball markers from firing. A good paintball mask is one which has an anti-fog, dual-pane, scratch less, and UV coated lens. Before making a buying decision, the mask must be checked for its glasses comparability, internal space, and ventilation.

See also 
 List of paintball markers
 Paintball equipment
 Paintball pistol
 Stock paintball

References

External links 

Pneumatic weapons
 
Rifles
Recreational weapons